A tressoir is a braid made of golden silk embroidered with metal and gems. It was worn by women in the 13th century.

Braids